A location is a fixed geographical point.

Location may also refer to:

Arts and entertainment
 Location (EP), a 2005 EP by The Grand Opening
"Location" (Khalid song), 2016
 "Location" (Playboi Carti song), 2017
"Location" (Dave song), 2019
 Filming location, a place where some or all of a film or television series is produced

Other uses
 Location (sign language), the location of the hands when signing
 HTTP location, an HTTP header field
Location, the placement of a facility in the facility location problem
Location, in statistics, the shift of distribution in a location parameter

See also
 Location parameter, a parameter of a probability distribution indicating the distribution's central tendency
 Locale (disambiguation)
 Locate (disambiguation)
 Locator (disambiguation)
 Locution (disambiguation)
 Allocation (disambiguation)
 Place (disambiguation)
 Position (disambiguation)